OurBus Inc. is  is a broker for motor carriers of passengers, and arranges for the transportation of passengers. The company offers intercity and commuter bus routes serving cities in New York, New Jersey, Pennsylvania, Delaware, Maryland, Virginia, Washington D.C., Massachusetts, Illinois, Indiana, and Florida. The company's first route in New Jersey launched in 2016.

Services

Intercity 
Intercity routes connect city-to-city with either no or few stops between.

Commuter 
OurBus Commuter routes provide daily service to commuters between suburban areas and city centers.

A commuter route formerly operated from Pleasanton, California to San Francisco.

OurBus in the news

Mar 24, 2021 -  Rally and OurBus announced their merger creating a technology company for mass mobility in the United States.

Sept 27, 2021 - The new OurBus route connects four locations in Ontario (Niagara Falls, Mississauga, Toronto, and Scarborough) with a final stop at Buffalo Airport. OurBus service from Buffalo Airport allows riders to continue their trips to western New York state (Rochester, Geneva, Ithaca, Binghamton); Fort Lee, New Jersey; and New York City as the final stop.

Oct 15, 2021 - OurBus has started a new bus service connecting New York City to Albany and key points in the Hudson Valley, including New Paltz and Woodbury Commons Premium Outlets. The digital intercity travel company doesn’t actually own its fleet of buses, it acts as a technology platform that creates a network of services by sourcing available independent charter buses that are often used by schools or churches.

References

External links

Transport companies established in 2016
Intercity bus companies of the United States
Bus transportation in New York (state)
Bus transportation in New Jersey
Bus transportation in Pennsylvania
Bus transportation in Delaware
Bus transportation in Maryland
Bus transportation in Washington, D.C.
Bus transportation in Florida
Transportation companies based in New York City